John Borlase (1650–1681), of Great Marlow, Buckinghamshire, was an English politician.

Early life
Borlase was educated at Eton and Magdalen Hall, Oxford. His father was the MP, William Borlase. His mother was Joanna Bankes, daughter of Sir.John Bankes, Chief Justice of the Common Pleas.

Career
He was a Member (MP) of the Parliament of England for Great Marlow in March 1679, October 1679 and 1681. During the Exclusion Crisis he was said to support Exclusion, and was marked by  Anthony Ashley-Cooper, 1st Earl of Shaftesbury as "honest", in the sense of reliable. However he obtained leave to retire to the country, and took no part in the Exclusion debates, nor does he seem to have played any further part in Parliamentary business.

References

1650 births
1681 deaths
Alumni of Magdalen Hall, Oxford
People educated at Eton College
English MPs 1679
People from Buckinghamshire